Stillbrook Hill is a mountain in Offaly, Ireland. With a height of 514 metres (1,686 ft) it is the second highest mountain in the Slieve Bloom Mountains after Arderin and the 520th highest summit in Ireland. It is the second highest mountain in Offaly.

See also
List of mountains in Ireland

References

Mountains and hills of County Offaly